Inland Township is one of sixteen townships in Clay County, Nebraska, United States. The population was 100 at the 20020 census. A 2021 estimate placed the township's population at 99.

See also
County government in Nebraska

References

External links
City-Data.com

Townships in Clay County, Nebraska
Hastings Micropolitan Statistical Area
Townships in Nebraska